Michael Dean Hewitt (born January 23, 1946) is an American politician of the Republican Party. He was a member of the Washington State Senate. He represented District 16 from 2001 to 2017.

Awards 
 2014 Guardians of Small Business award. Presented by NFIB.

References

1946 births
Living people
Republican Party Washington (state) state senators
Politicians from Walla Walla, Washington
21st-century American politicians